Sanjin Alagić (born 26 September 1977) is a Bosnian professional football manager and former player who is the current director of Bosnian Premier League club Velež Mostar.

He previously managed hometown club Sarajevo (academy and youth teams), Al-Ahli, Qadsia (youth team), Al-Salmiya, Šamorín and Nairobi City Stars.

Honours

Manager
Al-Ahli
Bahraini Premier League: 2009–10

Nairobi City Stars
Kenyan National Super League: 2019–20

References

External links
Sanjin Alagić at Sofascore

1977 births
Living people
Sportspeople from Sarajevo
Bosniaks of Bosnia and Herzegovina
Bosnia and Herzegovina football managers
Al-Ahli Club Manama managers
Al-Salmiya SC managers
Kuwait Premier League managers
Bosnia and Herzegovina expatriate football managers
Expatriate football managers in Bahrain
Bosnia and Herzegovina expatriate sportspeople in Bahrain
Expatriate football managers in Kuwait
Bosnia and Herzegovina expatriate sportspeople in Kuwait
Expatriate football managers in Slovakia
Bosnia and Herzegovina expatriate sportspeople in Slovakia
Expatriate football managers in Kenya
Bosnia and Herzegovina expatriate sportspeople in Kenya